Rocky Hill Public Schools or Rocky Hill School District is a school district headquartered in Rocky Hill, Connecticut.

Schools
 Rocky Hill High School
 Griswold Middle School
 Moser School
 Stevens Elementary School
 West Hill Elementary School

References

External links
 Rocky Hill School District
School districts in Connecticut
Education in Hartford County, Connecticut